The Michigan Department of Health and Human Services (MDHHS) is a principal department of state of Michigan, headquartered in Lansing, that provides public assistance, child and family welfare services, and oversees health policy and management.

Additionally, the MDHHS oversees Michigan's child and adult protective services, foster care, adoptions, juvenile justice, domestic violence, and child support programs. The MDHHS also licenses adult foster care, child day care and child welfare facilities.

History
In April 2015, the Department of Human Services (DHS) was merged with the Department of Community Health (DCH) to create the Department of Health and Human Services.

Department of Human Services
The Department of Human Services was created in 1965 as a principal department with the name of "Department of Social Services".  Renamed in 1995 to "Family Independence Agency", the department was once again renamed in 2004 to indicate its status as a principal department as the "Department of Human Services".

In August 2007, Governor Jennifer Granholm named Ismael Ahmed to replace Marianne Udow as department director effective September 10, 2007.

100 employees were laid off due to budget cuts in January 2015.

Department of Community Health
The Department of Community Health was created in 1996 through an executive order merging Department of Public Health (as Community Public Health Agency), Department of Mental Health, Medical Services Administration from the Department of Social Services, responsibility for Liquor Control Commission, Licensing, Monitoring and Accreditation and Division of Occupational Health from Department of Commerce, Food Service Sanitation from the Department of Agriculture and many functions of Department of Social Services.

Merger
The merger of the Department of Human Services (DHS) and the Department of Community Health was announced by Governor Rick Snyder during his 2015 State of the State address.

Programs
The department has several agencies and programs operating under its management.

Epidemiology
The Bureau of Epidemiology and Population Health is under the purview of the MDHHS. Past Chief Epidemiologists of Michigan include Professor Matthew Boulton of the University of Michigan.

Bureau of Juvenile Justice

The Bureau of Juvenile Justice is responsible for the operation of juvenile correctional facilities.

Facilities include:
 Bay Pines Center
 Shawono Center (Boys adjudicated for sex offenses)

Former facilities:
 W.J. Maxey Boys Training School (Closed October 1, 2015)

Districts
The Michigan Department of Health and Human Services is divided into 43 districts to service the 84 counties.
 Allegan County Health Department: Allegan
 Barry-Eaton District Health Department: Barry and Eaton
 Bay County Health Department: Bay
 Benzie-Leelanau District Health Department: Benzie and Leelanau
 Berrien County Health Department: Berrien
 Branch-Hillsdale-St. Joseph Community Health Agency: Branch, Hillsdale and St. Joseph
 Calhoun County Public Health Department: Calhoun
 Central Michigan District Health Department: Arenac, Clare, Gladwin, Isabella, Osceola and Roscommon
 Chippewa County Health Department: Chippewa
 Dickinson-Iron District Health Department: Dickinson and Iron
 District Health Department #2: Alcona, Iosco, Ogemaw, and Oscoda
 District Health Department #4: Alpena, Cheboygan, Montmorency, and Presque Isle
 District Health Department #10: Crawford, Kalkaska, Lake, Manistee, Mason, Mecosta, Missaukee, Newaygo, Oceana, and Wexford
 Genesee County Health Department: Genesee
 Grand Traverse County Health Department: Grand Traverse
 Health Department of Northwest Michigan: Antrim, Charlevoix, Emmet, and Otsego
 Huron County Health Department: Huron
 Ingham County Health Department: Ingham
 Ionia County Health Department: Ionia
 Jackson County Health Department: Jackson
 Kalamazoo County Health & Community Services Department: Kalamazoo
 Kent County Health Department: Kent
 Lapeer County Health Department: Lapeer
 Livingston County Health Department: Livingston
 Luce-Mackinac-Alger-Schoolcraft District Health Department: Alger, Luce, Mackinac and Schoolcraft
 Macomb County Health Department: Macomb
 Marquette County Health Department: Marquette
 Mid-Michigan District Health Department: Clinton, Gratiot and Montcalm
 Midland County Health Department: Midland
 Monroe County Health Department: Monroe
 Oakland County Health Division: Oakland
 Ottawa County Department of Public Health: Ottawa
 Public Health, Delta & Menominee Counties: Delta and Menominee
 Public Health – Muskegon County: Muskegon
 Saginaw County Health Department: Saginaw
 Sanilac County Health Department: Sanilac
 Shiawassee County Health Department: Shiawassee
 St. Clair County Health Department: St. Clair
 Tuscola County Health Department: Tuscola
 Van Buren/Cass District Health Department: Cass and Van Buren
 Washtenaw County Health Department: Washtenaw
 Wayne County Department of Health, Veterans & Community Wellness: Wayne
 Western Upper Peninsula Health Department: Baraga, Gogebic, Houghton, Keweenaw, and Ontonagon

References

External links

 Michigan Department of Human Services

State corrections departments of the United States
Human Services, Department of
Juvenile detention centers in the United States
2015 establishments in Michigan
State departments of health of the United States
Government agencies established in 2015